Birchington-on-Sea railway station is on the Chatham Main Line in England, serving the village of Birchington-on-Sea, Kent.

The station and all trains that serve the station are operated by Southeastern.

The station is located at one end of the high street and a short distance from the village square. Buses operate from the station to Minnis Bay and Margate on weekdays during peak hours; at other times buses can be caught from the village square.

History
The station was opened on 5 October 1863 by the Kent Coast Railway (KCR). The KCR was operated by the London, Chatham & Dover Railway (LCDR), which absorbed the KCR on 1 July 1871, and the station was renamed Birchington-on-Sea by the LCDR in October 1878. From the start of 1899, the LCDR's services were operated by the newly formed South Eastern & Chatham Railway, which the LCDR co-owned with the South Eastern Railway (SER). At the start of 1923, the LCDR amalgamated with other railways (including the SER) to form the Southern Railway. Two Pullman camping coaches were positioned here by the Southern Region from 1963 to 1967.

A small goods yard was situated on the Up London bound side of the station which closed in the 1970s and operated by the signalbox located midway on the down platform closed about the same time during a resignalling programme.  The wire and rod cutout can still be seen within the brick face of the down platform. The 2007 Budget plan of Network Rail allows for the removal of the remaining manual turnround and it is believed short residual siding occasionally used for storing tamping track maintenance units, 'tampers'.

A junction existed to the west of the station to serve RAF Manston until the 1930s operated from a Ground Frame Birchington B located some  upside of the station - a plan of which can be seen in the RAF Manston Museum.

Services
All services at Birchington-on-Sea are operated by Southeastern  using  and  EMUs.

The typical off-peak service in trains per hour is:

 1 tph to London St Pancras International
 1 tph to  
 2 tph to 

References

External links

Thanet
Railway stations in Kent
DfT Category E stations
Former London, Chatham and Dover Railway stations
Railway stations in Great Britain opened in 1863
Railway stations served by Southeastern